Nonprofits Insurance Alliance (NIA) is a group of cooperative 501(c)(3) nonprofit insurance organizations that provide liability and property insurance exclusively to other 501(c)(3) nonprofits.

History
Pamela Davis, NIA's Founder, President and CEO, was a graduate student at UC Berkeley during the liability insurance crisis of the 1980s, when insurance companies raised their premiums drastically, reduced their coverages, and left some segments of the market, including many nonprofits, completely uncovered. Davis' master's thesis, documented how the insurance crisis was harming nonprofit organizations and in some cases even putting them out of business. In 1987, she testified before the California General Assembly that:

Based on her research, Davis was convinced that conventional insurers did not fully understand insurance risk in the nonprofit sector, so she set out to create a nonprofit risk pool that could better meet the needs of nonprofits in California. In 1989, Davis secured $1.3 million in loans from nonprofit partners and foundations to create the Nonprofits Insurance Alliance of California (NIAC), the first and largest company in NIA.

Over the next decade, NIAC grew to serve thousands of nonprofits, but its operations were limited to the state of California. In order to replicate the NIAC model nationwide, Davis secured $5 million from the Bill & Melinda Gates Foundation and $5 million from the David & Lucile Packard Foundation to found the Alliance of Nonprofits for Insurance, Risk Retention Group (ANI).

Companies in the group

Nonprofits Insurance Alliance is an insurance cooperative composed of four distinct 501(c)(3) nonprofit organizations:

Nonprofits Insurance Alliance of California (NIAC): Provides liability and property insurance to nonprofits in California. 
Alliance of Nonprofits for Insurance, Risk Retention Group (ANI): Provides liability insurance to nonprofits with operations outside of California. 
National Alliance of Nonprofits for Insurance (NANI): Provides property reinsurance.
Alliance Member Services (AMS): Provides support to the other companies in the group and their partner programs.

Further reading

Official website of Nonprofits Insurance Alliance
Nonprofit and Liability Insurance: Problems, Options, and Prospects - Pamela Davis' Master's Thesis on the nonprofit insurance crisis, published by the Conrad Hilton Foundation and the California Community Foundation.

References

Insurance companies of the United States
Companies based in Santa Cruz, California
Financial services companies established in 1989
1989 establishments in California
Non-profit organizations based in California
Companies established in 1989
Financial services companies of the United States
1989 establishments in the United States